Magnetic Poetry is the second album by British indie pop band Comet Gain. The album consists of songs written by frontman David Feck only, following the departure of the remainder of Comet Gain (taking the songs they penned with them) to form the band Velocette. The album had extra tracks added for its American release and was re-named Sneaky.

Track listing

References

1997 albums
Comet Gain albums